Philippe Lamine (born 4 October 1976 in Lyon) is a retired French athlete who specialised in the 110 metres hurdles. Lamine competed at the 1997 IAAF World Indoor Championships in Paris.

He has personal bests of 13.75 seconds in the 110 metres hurdles (Bron 2000) and 7.63 seconds in the 60 metres hurdles (Liévin 2000).

Competition record

References 

1976 births
Living people
French male hurdlers
Athletes from Lyon
20th-century French people
21st-century French people